Neolissochilus blythii is a species of cyprinid in the genus Neolissochilus.

References

Cyprinidae
Cyprinid fish of Asia
Fish of Myanmar